Ingeborg Geisendörfer (30 May 1907 – 25 June 2006) was a German politician of the Christian Social Union in Bavaria (CSU) and former member of the German Bundestag.

Life 
Ingeborg Geisendörfer was a member of the German Bundestag from 1953 to 1972.

Literature

References

1907 births
2006 deaths
Members of the Bundestag for Bavaria
Members of the Bundestag 1969–1972
Members of the Bundestag 1965–1969
Members of the Bundestag 1961–1965
Members of the Bundestag 1957–1961
Members of the Bundestag 1953–1957
Female members of the Bundestag
20th-century German women politicians
Members of the Bundestag for the Christian Social Union in Bavaria